Shore Acres is a 1920 American drama film directed by Rex Ingram that was based on the stage play by James A. Herne. It was adapted from the play by Arthur J. Zellner.

The silent film was released on May 16, 1920, and runs for 60 minutes, over 6 reels. It is unknown if any copies of the film survive. Thus the film may be lost.

Plot
A period newspaper gives the following description: "Shore Acres is a story of plain New England folk on the rock ribbed coast of Maine. Martin Berry, a stern old lighthouse keeper, forbids his spirited daughter Helen to speak to the man she loves! It is Martin's fondest hope that Helen will marry Josiah Blake, the village banker. Helen refuses to obey her father, and elopes with her sweetheart on the "Liddy Ann," a vessel bound down the coast. Her father learns of her departure, and insane with rage, he prevents his brother, Nathaniel, from lighting the beacon that will guide the vessel safely out through the rocks of the harbor. Desperately the two men battle together in the lighthouse—one to save the vessel, the other to destroy her. A sou'easter is raging, and during their struggle the "Liddy Ann" goes on the rocks and the passengers are left to the mercy of the storm. The scene fairly makes the nerves tingle with excitement. What befalls thereafter is thrillingly unfolded in this picturization of the greatest American play of the century. Shore Acres is a big human drama of thrills and heart throbs, replete with delicious humor and tender pathos."

Cast
Alice Lake as Helen Berry
Robert D. Walker as Sam Warren
Edward Connelly as Uncle Nat Berry
Frank Brownlee as Martin Berry
Joseph Kilgour as Josiah Blake
Margaret McWade as Ann Berry, Martin's Wife
Nancy Caswell as Milly Berry
Franklyn Garland as Captain Ben
Burwell Hamrick as Young Nat Berry
Richard Headrick as Richard Berry
Carol Jackson as Carol Berry
John P. Morse as Tom
Mary Beaton (undetermined role)

Production
Director Rex Ingram and Alice Terry first met during the making of the film in 1920. They would eventually marry over a weekend during filming of The Prisoner of Zenda in 1922.

Shore Acres was filmed near Laguna, California.

References

External links

1920 films
1920 drama films
Silent American drama films
American black-and-white films
American silent feature films
Films directed by Rex Ingram
Metro Pictures films
1920s American films